Claudia Olsen (22 September 1896 – 9 November 1980) was a Norwegian politician for the Conservative Party.

She was born in Tønsberg.

She was elected to the Norwegian Parliament from the Market towns of Vestfold in 1945, and was re-elected on three occasions.

Olsen was a member of the executive committee of Tønsberg city council in the period 1928–1931, and was a regular city council member between 1933 and 1945.

References

Norwegian women's rights activists
1896 births
1980 deaths
Members of the Storting
Women members of the Storting
Conservative Party (Norway) politicians
Politicians from Tønsberg
20th-century Norwegian politicians
20th-century Norwegian women politicians